A krsnik  (female: krsnica) or kresnik is a type of vampire hunter, a shaman whose spirit wanders from the body in the form of an animal.  The krsnik turns into an animal at night to fight off the kudlak, his evil vampire antithesis, with the krsnik appearing as a white animal and the kudlak as a black one.  The krsniks soul leaves the body, either voluntarily or due to a higher power, to fight evil agents and ensure good harvest, health, and happiness.

The legend evolved from a pre-Christian myth present in Slovenia and Croatia (mainly Istria and the islands), where the celestial pagan god Perun is locked in eternal combat with the evil snake of the underworld, Veles. The krsnik is taught magic by Vile (fairies),  and in traditional medicine has the ability to heal people and cattle. However, due to the undocumented nature of oral tradition, it's difficult to determine with certainty how much of kresnik folklore originated from Slavic mythology, and how much arose from a separate shamanistic tradition.  After Christianization, the kresnik instead was claimed to have learned magic at the School of Black Magic in Babylon, but retained benevolent traits as a generous and powerful friend of the poor.  

The origin of the name may be from the word krst, which means "cross", and which in  Serbia is the word for a stone sign denoting village boundaries. It may also be derived from the same root as the Slav word for "resurrection," so that the word itself means something approximating "resurrector." 

Similar beliefs circulated among the Italian Benandanti cult.

In popular culture 
 In the novel, anime, and manga series Trinity Blood, a "Crusnik" is a vampire that feeds on the blood of other vampires. Lilith Sahl, Cain, Seth, and Abel Nightroad are Crusnik who are much more powerful than regular vampires, who have the bacillus kudlak. They all take different forms: Cain appears as an angel with white wings, even though he is the antagonist, whereas Abel appears slightly demonic with black wings and red eyes, while being the protagonist. Kudlak also appears in the series as a bacillus that is responsible of the creation of "normal" vampires.
 Kresnik and Kudlak are recurring characters in the Shin Megami Tensei series of video games.
 Kresnik is the name of a mythological hero in Tales of Xillia. A superweapon bearing the name "Lance of Kresnik" is a plot device. The sequel features one of the hero's descendants, named Ludger Will Kresnik. A plot-significant machine named Kudlak is also present.
 The main villain in Darkness Hunts by Keri Arthur is a male serial killer who believes he is a kresnik hunting down supposed kudlaks and murdering them.
 Kudlak appears as a card in the online collectible card game Shadowverse. The mechanics of the card allow copies of Kudlak to be placed in the player’s deck after his defeat, which mirrors the theme of Kudlak’s recurring return.

See also
 Kresnik (deity)
 Vampire hunter
 Vedmak
 Wendigo-hunter
 Zduhać

References

Further reading
 Bošković-Stulli, Maja. "Kresnik—Krsnik, ein Wesen aus der kroatischen und slovenischen Volksüberlieferung". In: Fabula 3, no. 2 (1960): 275-298. https://doi-org.wikipedialibrary.idm.oclc.org/10.1515/fabl.1960.3.2.275
 Šešo, Luka; Polonijo, Ivana (Translator). "O krsniku: od tradicijske pojave u predajama do stvarnog iscjelitelja" [Krsnik: from Tradition to Actual Healing]. In: Studia ethnologica Croatica 14/15 (2003): 23-53.
 Vinšćak, Tomo. "O štrigama, štrigunima i krsnicima u Istri" [On Štrige, Štriguni and Krsnici on Istrian Peninsula]. In: Studia ethnologica Croatica 17 (2005): 221-235.

Shapeshifting
Croatian folklore
Slovene mythology
Istria
Vampires